PulsePoint is a 911-connected mobile app that allows users to view and receive alerts on calls being responded to by fire departments and emergency medical services. The app's main feature, and where its name comes from, is that it sends alerts to users at the same time that dispatchers are sending the call to emergency crews. The goal is to increase the possibility that a victim in cardiac arrest will receive cardiopulmonary resuscitation (CPR) quickly. The app uses the current location of a user and will alert them if someone in their vicinity is in need of CPR. The app, which interfaces with the local government public safety answering point, will send notifications to users only if the victim is in a public place and only to users that are in the immediate vicinity of the emergency. In February 2017, PulsePoint introduced a professional version called Verified Responder that also alerts in residential settings. Based in the San Francisco Bay Area, PulsePoint is run by a public 501(c)(3) non-profit foundation of the same name. As of January 30, 2020, the foundation reported that connected agencies had requested the assistance of 350,000 nearby responders for 100,000 cardiac arrest events.

In addition to Android and iOS, PulsePoint offers a web client at  that allows users to view the same data that appears in PulsePoint Respond with a browser. PulsePoint uses a standardized set of incident types normalized across Public Safety Answering Points (PSAP) and Computer-aided Dispatch (CAD) system vendors. The foundation also underwrites an automated external defibrillator (AED) app and registry to provide location information to PulsePoint responders and dispatchers.

In September 2018, the PulsePoint Respond app was approved by the First Responder Network Authority (FirstNet) and added to the App Catalog. PulsePoint Respond is a FirstNet Certified app.

History 
Richard Price, president of the PulsePoint Foundation, said that the idea for the application came to him in 2010 while he was serving as the fire chief in the San Ramon Valley. While he was out to lunch, he heard sirens and saw one of his own engines pull up in front of the restaurant he was dining in.  It turned out that someone next door had collapsed and gone into cardiac arrest. Since Price was the department chief, he was not dispatched to the call and did not know about it, but he was CPR certified and carried a defibrillator in his car. This incident left him wondering if technology could help produce a way for civilians who were trained to help in the event of a nearby emergency.  The American Heart Association estimates that 383,000 out of hospital cardiac arrests occur each year in the United States.

In April 2012, PulsePoint was one of only five mobile applications worldwide to be nominated for a Webby Award. It was nominated under the category of Best Use of GPS or Location Technology. A year later, in 2013, it was once again nominated in the same category. In 2014, the application was once again nominated, this time in the category of City & Urban Innovation.

AED Registry 
Along with the intention of getting CPR started faster and more often, a key objective of the PulsePoint Respond app is to inform those near a cardiac arrest event of the location of Automated External Defibrillators (AED) in the immediate vicinity of the victim. To accomplish this, the PulsePoint Foundation maintains an on‑demand (cloud-based) registry of AED locations and encourages anyone to contribute device locations. This crowdsourced AED location information is subsequently reviewed by local public safety agencies with support from the foundation. Approved AEDs are then shown to responders and dispatchers during cardiac emergencies via the PulsePoint AED Registry API. All aspects of the registry are provided free of charge.

On April 12, 2017, the PulsePoint Foundation announced a partnership with Priority Dispatch Corporation to allow dispatchers to inform callers of the location of nearby AEDs when the Medical Priority Dispatch System deemed them necessary. The PulsePoint AED registry is FirstNet Certified for use in emergency communications centers in the United States. 

In June 2019 PulsePoint extended the registry to include other collocated resources including Naloxone (e.g., Narcan®) and Epinephrine (e.g., EpiPen®), along with Bleeding Control Kits.

Concerns 
Some privacy experts have expressed concern that the app may invade the medical privacy of victims. The Los Angeles County Fire Department, one of the many users of the app, has pointed out that The Health Insurance Portability and Accountability Act (HIPAA) protects the privacy of identifiable health information.  On a ‘CPR Needed’ notification, which is sent out through the app, the only information that is seen is an address (which must be in a public place) and a business name, if available. The individually identifiable health information protected by HIPAA, such as name, birth date, or SSN are not reported or even known by the PulsePoint application.

Additional concerns that have been raised are that the app can cause too many bystanders to congregate at the scene of an emergency and that those responding via the app may not be trained in CPR or AED.

On May 9, 2018, the International Association of Fire Chiefs (IAFC) issued a Position Statement on PulsePoint.

Features 
Along with being able to view a list of calls in real time, users also have the option to listen in to radio traffic to accompany the application’s incident list. During a CPR-needed response, this functionality allows citizen and off-duty rescuers to hear the dispatcher update emergency responders regarding patient location, scene conditions, etc. To facilitate the live feed, PulsePoint uses Broadcastify, a website that is the largest broadcaster of live public safety audio feeds, to stream radio channels within the app.

On December 11, 2018, PulsePoint released v4.1 for iOS that included the ability to override a device's Do Not Disturb setting and play an alert sound even when the device is muted for “CPR Needed” alerts. This required a special entitlement from Apple.

An additional feature of the application is an interface with Flickr that allows agencies to share photos through the app. Users can view incident, event, station, apparatus, and other photos that the agency chooses to share.

Users 

As of February 2022 the dispatch centers in more than 4,200 communities were connected to PulsePoint. Some of the most well-known agencies include:
 
 Akron Fire Department
 Alameda County Fire Department
 Albuquerque Fire Rescue
Anaheim Fire & Rescue
 Anne Arundel County Fire Department
 Atlanta Fire Rescue Department
 Bloomington Fire Department
 Brevard County Fire Rescue
 British Columbia Ambulance Service
 California Department of Forestry and Fire Protection
 Chesapeake Fire Department
 Cincinnati Fire Department
 City of Casa Grande Fire Department
 Clark County Fire Department (Nevada)
 Cleveland EMS
 Columbus Division of Fire
 Coral Springs Fire Department
 District of Columbia Fire and Emergency Medical Services Department
 El Paso Fire Department
 Fairfax County Fire and Rescue Department
 Fort Lauderdale Fire-Rescue Department
 Frisco Fire Department
 Hawaii Fire Department
 Henderson Fire Department
 Hilton Head Island Fire Rescue
 Honolulu EMS
 Howard County Department of Fire and Rescue Services
 Kansas City Fire Department
 Kansas City Kansas Fire Department
 Kern County Fire Department
 Las Vegas Fire & Rescue Department
Lincoln Fire & Rescue Department
Livermore-Pleasanton Fire Department
Long Beach Fire Department (California)
 Los Angeles County Fire Department
 Los Angeles Fire Department
 Madison Fire Department
 Marin County Fire Department
 Mecklenburg County, North Carolina
 Miami Beach Fire Department
 Milwaukee Fire Department
 Naperville Fire Department
 Norfolk Fire Rescue
Orange City Fire Department
 Orange County Fire Authority
 Orange County Fire Rescue
 Orlando Fire Department
 Palm Beach County Fire Rescue
 Pittsburgh Dept. of Public Safety and Allegheny County Emergency Services
 Plano Fire-Rescue
 Portland Fire & Rescue
 Prince George's County Fire/EMS Department
 Prince William County Department of Fire and Rescue
 Rapid City Fire Department
 Reno Fire Department
 Richmond Fire Department (Virginia)
 Riverside Fire Department
 Sacramento Fire Department
 Sacramento Metropolitan Fire District
 Salem Fire Department
 San Bernardino County Fire Department
 San Diego Fire-Rescue Department
 San Francisco Fire Department
 San Jose Fire Department
 San Luis Obispo Fire Department
 San Ramon Valley Fire Protection District
 Santa Barbara County Fire Department
 Santa Clara County Fire Department
 Seattle Fire Department
 Seminole County Fire Department
 Sioux Falls Fire Rescue
 Sonoma County Fire District
 South Bend Fire Department
South Metro Fire Rescue
 Spokane Fire Department
 Suffolk County Department of Fire, Rescue and Emergency Services
 Tualatin Valley Fire and Rescue
 Tucson Fire Department
 Ventura County Fire Department
 Virginia Beach Department of Emergency Medical Services
 Wake County EMS
 Winnipeg Fire Paramedic Service

Incident Responder Unit Codes

Orange=Dispatched (?=Awaiting Acknowledge)
Green=En Route
Red=Arrived

The codes themselves are defined by each agency, and are typically followed by a number to identify a particular instance of each asset type. A legend is sometimes provided on the agency information page, and following are some common examples:

B=Battalion
BC=Battalion Chief
E=Engine
CMD=Command
CPT=Helicopter
C=Crew
DZR=Dozer
HM=Hazmat
ME=Medic Engine
MRE=Medic Rescue Engine
P=Patrol
R=Rescue
RE=Rescue Engine
SQ=Squad
T=Truck
U=Utility
WT=Water Tender

References

External links 
PulsePoint Website
@PulsePoint (Twitter)

PulsePoint Web Client
PulsePoint AED Registry

PulsePoint Respond on App Store
PulsePoint Respond on Google Play
PulsePoint AED on App Store
PulsePoint AED on Google Play

Android (operating system) software
IOS software